Cornwallis was a village in the parish of Cornwallis and county of Somerset, about 80 miles from Hobart in the nineteenth century.

References

Midlands (Tasmania)
Populated places established in the 19th century
Ghost towns in Tasmania